Charlton is a village in Northumberland, England.

Governance 
Charlton is in the parliamentary constituency of Hexham.

Transport 
Charlton was served by Charlton railway station on the Border Counties Railway which linked the Newcastle and Carlisle Railway, near Hexham, with the Border Union Railway at Riccarton Junction. The first section of the route was opened between Hexham and Chollerford in 1858, the remainder opening in 1862. The line was closed to passengers by British Railways in 1956. Part of the line is now beneath the surface of Kielder Water.

References

Villages in Northumberland
Bellingham, Northumberland